Andreas Berger (1584–1656) was a German composer whose works featured in the collection of J. S. Bach. He was the son-in-law of the English emigre musician William Brade.

Works, editions, and recordings
Eight Part Canon in the Eighth Mode for Two Double Reed Quartet Choirs.
Berger, Andreas: »Da pacem Domine & c. ... Deo ter opt. maximo, regi regum, Domino exercituum, principi pacis ...«. Augsburg: Johann Ulrich Schönig, 1635. Konzert zu 10 Stimmen in 2 Chören (SSATB/SATBB). On Friedens-Seufftzer und Jubel-Geschrey - Music for the Peace of Westphalia. Weser-Renaissance Ensemble Bremen dir. Manfred Cordes. cpo

References

1584 births
1656 deaths
German Baroque composers
German classical composers
17th-century classical composers
German male classical composers
17th-century male musicians